Thailand entered World War II in October 1940, initially against Vichy French forces in the Franco-Thai War. But Japan intervened and forced the Thai government to align with Axis forces; relations with Japan remained tense until the end of the war. This page lists military equipment used during the Franco-Thai War, Malaya and Burma campaign as well as equipment later received from the Japanese.

Edged weapons

Japanese Type 30 bayonet for Arisaka rifle
Siamese Type 45 bayonet for Mauser rifle

Sidearms

Pistols and revolvers (semi-automatic and manual)

Astra 300
Colt M1911
FN M1900
FN M1910
FN M1903
Nambu Type 14
Type 78 Luger
Type 79 Colt Super
Type 80 Star
Type 82 Colt Official Police

Automatic pistols and submachine guns

MP 35
MP 18
Nambu Type 100
Type 80 machine pistol

Rifles

Arisaka Type 38
Arisaka Type 99
Siamese Type 46 Mauser rifle
Siamese Type 46/66 Mauser rifle
Siamese Type 47 Mauser carbine
Siamese Type 47/66 Mauser carbine
Siamese Type 66 Mauser rifle

Machine guns

Dual purpose and infantry machine guns

Type 66 Browning M1917 (heavy machine gun rechambered for 8mm and adopted in 1924)
Type 66 Madsen machine gun (light machine gun adopted in 1924)
Type 92 heavy machine gun (adopted in 1941 to cope with the shortage of the 8mm ammunition)
Vickers machine gun commercial D (12.7mm rechambered for 8mm, used for AA duties and adopted in 1935)

Grenades and grenade launchers

Japanese grenades were imported in 1941 for the use by marines and made by Ordnance Department [กรมช่างแสงทหารบก]

Anti-tank guns

Bofors 37 mm M1934 anti-tank gun
Type 94 37 mm anti-tank gun

Anti-tank weapons (besides anti-tank guns)

Type 97 automatic cannon (anti-tank and anti-aircraft)

Anti-aircraft weapons

Light anti-aircraft guns

Bofors 40 mm anti-aircraft gun
Vickers Armstrongs QF 2-pounder naval anti-aircraft gun (pom-pom)

Heavy anti-aircraft guns

Type 77 Bofors 75 mm L/30 luftvarns kanon h.S.K.M. 1914

Artillery

Infantry mortars

Type 10 grenade discharger
Type 94 90 mm Infantry Mortar

Field artillery

Bofors 75 mm mountain gun
Type 49 Krupp M1906 mountain gun
Type 51 7.5 cm Gebirgskanone M1908 mountain gun (the Type 1 was adopted in 1909)
Type 51 7.5 cm Gebirgskanone M1908 mountain gun (the Type 2 was adopted in 1909)
Type 63 mountain gun (the Japanese copy of the 7.5 cm Gebirgskanone M1908 was adopted in 1921)
Type 77 Bofors 47/75 mm infantry gun (adopted in 1934)
Type 78 10.5 cm kanon m/34 heavy infantry gun (adopted in 1935)
Type 78 Bofors 150 mm M.15/16 heavy howitzer mortar (unknown amount was adopted in 1935)
Type 80 Bofors 75 mm L/40 light infantry howitzer (adopted in 1937 from B.Grimm company as an agent)
Type 80 Bofors 105 mm light howitzer (adopted in 1937)

Vehicles

Trucks

Morris truck (unknown number)

Armored cars

Vickers-Morris M1931 (6 purchased)

Self-propelled guns

Vickers Armstrongs QF 2-pounder naval anti-aircraft gun on Vickers 6-Ton tractor (upgrade level close to the Dragon Mk IV chassis, 36 purchased)

Tankettes

Type 73 Carden-Loyd Mk VI tankette (10 imported from England in 1930)
Type 77 Carden-Loyd Mk VI modified tankette (30 imported from England in 1934)

Tanks

Type 76 Vickers 6ton Mk E light tank (12 imported from England in 1933)
Type 76 Vickers-Carden-Loyd A4E12 light amphibious tank (2 purchased from England in 1933)
Type 81 Vickers 6ton Mk B light tank (8 out of 12 imported from England in 1938 but the other 4 refused)
Type 83 light tank (50 Type 95 Ha-Go were purchased from Japan in 1940)

Navy ships and war vessels

Coastal Defence Ship

HTMS Sri Ayudhya
HTMS Thonburi

Torpedo boats

HTMS Chantaburi
HTMS Chonburi
HTMS Chumporn
HTMS Pattani
HTMS Phuket
HTMS Rayong
HTMS Songhkla
HTMS Trad

Other war vessels

HTMS Nhong Sarhai minelayer
Thiew Uthok fishery protection ship

Escort vessels

HTMS Mae Klong (Tachin class)
HTMS Tachin (Tachin class)

Light cruisers

Etna ex Naresuan
Etna ex Taksin

Submarines

HTMS Matchanu
HTMS Phlai Chumpon
HTMS Sinsamut
HTMS Wirun

Aircraft

Avro 504 (strafing airplane, 20 imported in 1930, 50 locally produced)
Curtiss BF2C goshawk  (fighter Used 24 Made in Thailand 50 total 74 imported in 1934-1938.)
Curtiss P-36 Hawk (fighter The Royal Thai Air Force procures 25 aircraft with 23 mm air cannons. )
Martin B-10 (bomber airplane, 6 received from USA in 1937 and 9 ex Dutch airplanes from Japan in 1943)
Mitsubishi Ki-21 (heavy bomber airplane, 9 delivered by Japanese in December 1941)
Mitsubishi Ki-30 (light bomber airplane, 24 airplanes)
Nakajima E8N (ship borne airplane, 18 imported in late 1940)
Nakajima Ki-27 (fighter airplane, 12 delivered in January 1942)
Nakajima Ki-43 (fighter airplane, 24 delivered in 1943)
Tachikawa Ki-36 (24 purchased in 1942, locally designated as Type 6 trainer)
Vought O2U Corsair (12 bought in 30 March 1933, 25 built in 1936, 50 more built in 1940, locally designated Type A-1 observation and attacker)
Watanabe E9W (submarine borne airplane, 6 imported in May 1938, locally designated WS.103S)
Mitsubishi A6M  ( It was delivered in the A6M2 Model 21 and A6M5 Model 52 models. )

Bristol Blenheim import and license production agreement was cancelled in 1940, also the license production of North American P-64  and  total amount 100 was planned but cancelled when the airplane was turned back while en route in October 1940 due US arms embargo

See also

List of common World War II infantry weapons

References

 
Thailand Army World War II